Carlo Brioschi (24 June 1826  – 12 November 1895) was a painter and scenic designer, born in Milan, Italy, but mostly active in Austria.

Biography 
Carlo was the son of the scenic designer Giuseppe Brioschi (died in Vienna in 1856) and father of the similarly engaged Othmar (1854–1912) and Anton (1855–1920). He was a student of Leopold Kupelwieser, Thomas Ender, and  Franz Steinfeld at the Academy of Fine Arts, Vienna. In 1853, he worked in Paris. From 1856 to 1886, he worked with the Vienna State Opera.

With Johann Kautsky and Hermann Burghart he established the cooperative enterprise of "Brioschi, Burghart und Kautsky, k.u.k. Hoftheatermaler in Wien", which employed dozens of carpenters, blacksmiths, mechanics and clerks in addition to their painters; among whom were Georg Janny, Ferdinand Brunner and Alfons Mucha. The studio received many orders from abroad as well as locally. Among their regular customers was the Metropolitan Opera in New York.

Brioschi died in Vienna in 1895.

References

Further reading 
 Robin Thurlow Lacy: Brioschi, Carlo. In: A biographical dictionary of scenographers : 500 B.C. to 1900 A.D. Greenwood Press, New York 1990, pp. 82–83.

1826 births
1895 deaths
19th-century Italian painters
Italian male painters
Italian scenic designers
Austrian scenic designers
Austrian painters
Austrian male painters
19th-century Italian male artists